Leptobrachella natunae (sometimes known as the Natuna Borneo frog or Natuna Island frog) is a species of amphibian in the family Megophryidae. It is endemic to Natuna Besar in the Natuna Islands (Indonesia) of South China Sea. It has not been recorded after its description, more than a century ago. Its natural habitats are tropical moist lowland forests and rivers.

References

natunae
Amphibians of Indonesia
Endemic fauna of Indonesia
Fauna of Sumatra
Least concern biota of Asia
Amphibians described in 1895
Taxa named by Albert Günther
Taxonomy articles created by Polbot